Dominique Franco is the president of the French Académie nationale de chirurgie. He is also advisor on instruction at the biomedical research center Institut Pasteur.

References 

Living people
French surgeons
Year of birth missing (living people)